Pike County Gulch is a coastal valley in Marin County, California, United States, which is associated with a small stream.  It is located between Wilkins Gulch (to the northwest) and Audubon Canyon (to the southeast).

References

See also
List of watercourses in the San Francisco Bay Area

Valleys of Marin County, California
West Marin